The Dents de Bouquetins or just the Bouquetins (French for Alpine ibexes) are a multi-summited mountain of the Alps between Switzerland and Italy. They form a ridge composed of several summits above 3,600 metres, of which the highest is 3,838 metres. The Bouquetins are the highest mountain on the main watershed of the Pennine Alps west of the Dent d'Hérens.

A shelter (Refuge des Bouquetins), owned by the Swiss Alpine Club, is located at the western base of the mountain.

See also
List of mountains of Switzerland

References

External links
 Bouquetins on Hikr

Mountains of the Alps
Alpine three-thousanders
Mountains of Switzerland
Mountains of Italy
Mountains of Valais
Three-thousanders of Switzerland